Retrospective 88-99 is the name of the third "best-of" album by German industrial music band X Marks the Pedwalk. It was released by Metropolis Records in North America in CD format.

Track listing
 "Facer"  – 5:39
 "Abattoir (Razormaid Mix)"  – 5:54
 "Drawback"  – 6:47
 "Never Look Back"  – 5:46
 "Monomaniac (Mix)"  – 4:58
 "Maximum Pace"  – 6:20
 "Paranoid Illusions"  – 4:09
 "I Promise You a Murder"  – 5:04
 "Wipe No Tears"  – 4:12
 "Arbitrary Execution"  – 5:44
 "Ten Miles"  – 4:30
 "No Premonition"  – 5:04
 "Look on this Side"  – 4:19
 "Sweep Hand (Timeless)"  – 4:35

X Marks the Pedwalk albums
1999 compilation albums
Industrial compilation albums
Metropolis Records compilation albums